Gloria Criscione Pineda, known artistically as "Gloria del Paraguay" is a Paraguayan soprano, recognized for her versatile voice.
She performs both in classical music concerts as well as singing arias. She sings arias as a lyric soprano, as a dramatic soprano, and as a mezzo-soprano. Her repertoire also includes folklore from Paraguay and Latin America.

Early life and education
Gloria Criscione Pineda is daughter of an Italian father and a Spanish mother; she was born in Paraguay. She started her studies at the age of 5 years old. She attended the School of Fine Arts where she began studying declamation and dance. At the age of eleven she became a student of the famous teacher Aurelia Camihor Lofrucio. At the age of twelve she sang as a soloist of the Symphonic Orchestra and the Paraguayan Athenaeum Choir.
She was the lead singer of various zarzuelas or musical comedies and operettas, then starting her own opera company known as the "Compañia Paraguaya de Comedias Musicales". She has a Masters in Psychology and Social Sciences.
She is an expert in Nutrition.
She also studied Marketing and Journalism in Geneva.

Career
For a long time, she dedicated herself to singing folkloric Paraguayan music as well as Latin American music.
She compiled and rescued the African rhythms of Cambá Kuá – Paraguay.
She went on long tours to Europe, Asia, the United States of America and Latin America.
She has 33 recordings. Her first recording took place in Portugal.

She was the first Latin American performer on 5 February 1995, to sing as a soloist in a concert at the Manhattan Center in New York City.
She was the first singer to record the three most difficult minutes of the tenor of the Tosca Opera "E lucevan le stelle".

In Spain, her performances on television and radio brought her recognition.
She was presented with the "España de Oro" prize as the best Spanish language singer, and also won the "T” prize that stands for triumphant three consecutive times as the "Best Singer in Spanish Language".
In Chile, she was part of the jury at the "Viña del Mar International Song Festival", as well as at the "OTI Festival".

As a poet, Pineda was invited to the fourth Book Fair in Paris, and her poems are part of the compilation of Paraguayan poems of the PEN CLUB, that gives awards to the best hundred Paraguayan writers.
She has five published books whose titles are "Cristal", "Cuarzo y Cristal", "Transmutaciòn y Silencio", "Clave y Recuerdos" and "Medicina Natural, su alternativa".

She took some years off stage to organize a Foundation for the Arts, Sciences and Technology "Gloria International Foundation". Now Gloria del Paraguay is back on stage, singing in concerts to raise money for her Foundation, which is one of the singer's priorities.

Awards and honours

At 13 years of age, she represented Paraguay for the first time at the Festival Sudamericano in Salta, Argentina, winning first prize for "Performance and Song".
She was proposed by the Universidad Nacional de Asunción for the PRINCIPE DE ASTURIAS award for her work in integrating Latin American nations.
She was received by Pope John Paul II as the spokeswoman of all Latin American artists.
She was nominated Cultural Traveling Representative of the Republic of Paraguay and also Ambassador of the Arts.
She was nominated Peace Ambassador in 2007 by the International Intrareligious Federation for World Peace, whose headquarters are in the United States of America. This foresaid Federation in recognized by the United Nations.
By resolution of the Municipality of Asunción, she was named Beloved Daughter of the city.
In the year 2003, the Universidad Iberoamericana, awarded her with the "Honors Diploma", engraving her name in a plaque that is part of a mural at the University, that sets example for all future generations of students.
The Office of the Public Defender of the Republic of Paraguay nominated her "Leading Woman of Paraguay".
She was selected in between 141 singers, at the Manhattan Center in New York City, to be one of the three sopranos to sing at the first soprano concert, for world peace, “The Sopranos World Concert, for World Pace” (this concert will be repeated around the world, in sites that the United Nations have declared World Heritage). In unison with soprano Seiko Lee from Japan and M. Zuri from the United States of America. In this concert various orchestra directors were summoned: David Eaton from the United States of America, famous Director of the New York City Symphony, Luca Testa from Italy, who is a specialist in Italian opera with particular emphasis in operas of stravagant realism also known as Verismo Operas, the styles of Verdi and Puccini, and Florentín Giménez, from Paraguay, who has composed one hundred chamber orchestra pieces of which ten of them are Paraguayan musical comedies also known as zarzuelas, four symphonic poems, two ballet suites, and four concerts for piano, violin and violoncello.
In February 2009, the Universidad Metropolitana de Asunción, acknowledges Gloria Criscione Pineda, for all her positive actions in favor of building a more dignified, democratic and fair society; as one of the women who helped make a difference in Paraguayan History.

References
THE SOPRANOS WORLD CONCERT, FOR WORLD PACE; Sopranos mujeres de tres continentes unidas en un canto de amor y paz. (in Spanish and English)
Article: El Banco Central del Paraguay será sede hoy y mañana del espectáculo “The Sopranos World Concert”. ABC Digital. 14 November 2007. (in Spanish)
La Noche de las Sopranos ABC Digital. 17 November 2007. (in Spanish)
Comunicato Stampa dell'Ufficio Cultura Originally from S. Maria degli Angeli e dei Martiri article. 7 December 2002 (in Italian)
Nella Basilica degli Angeli dei Martiri Roma Italia  Copyright 2004 – 2008 Lacittadellapace.it – Fondazione Culturale "Paolo di Tarso" (in Italian)
Especial: News, photos and videos about “Gloria del Paraguay” (in Spanish)
Article: Con el deslumbrante marco de la Basílica de Caacupé repleta de fieles, como escenario, la cantante Gloria del Paraguay entonó tres canciones para homenajear a la Virgen La Nación Edición Impresa. 8 December 2008 (in Spanish)
Cultura e TAM Mercosur trazem a solista Gloria Del Paraguay para o Canal da Música AEN. 5 November 2004 (in Portuguese)
Article: Un espectáculo singular se desarrollará hoy en homenaje al creador de la guarania, José Asunción Flores.  GuiaCultural.com. 27 August 2007 (in Spanish)
Article: Con la presencia de la intérprete Gloria del Paraguay y del Director de la Orquesta Sinfónica de la Ciudad de Nueva York, David Eaton. Originally from UTIC article. September 2006. (in Spanish)

External links
The official authorized Website of Gloria del Paraguay (in Spanish, English, Italian and Portuguese)

Paraguayan women poets
21st-century Paraguayan women singers
Operatic sopranos
Living people
Paraguayan people of Italian descent
Paraguayan people of Spanish descent
21st-century Paraguayan poets
20th-century Paraguayan women singers
21st-century women opera singers
Year of birth missing (living people)
21st-century Paraguayan women writers